Blooming Rose is a ghost town in Garrett County, Maryland. The town was named after the large quantity of wildflowers visible when the area was first surveyed.

History 
The first permanent settler in Blooming Rose was Richard Hall, who died in 1791, though it is unknown when he arrived in Blooming Rose. The second permanent settlers, John and Catherine Rutan, arrived in Blooming Rose in 1787 and established an apple orchard. In 1791, 40 families moved to Blooming Rose, many seeking reprieve from the Northwest Indian War.

Geography 
Blooming Rose Road has an overpass across Interstate 68. Blooming Rose Road intersects with Maryland Route 42, to the north of the historically significant Hinebaugh House and the Blooming Rose Church. Blooming Rose has some individual buildings which are on the National Register of Historic Places for architectural merits, but the town itself is not considered significant.

See also 
 List of ghost towns in Maryland

References 

Ghost towns in Maryland